Cuban–American Treaty of Relations may refer to:

Cuban–American Treaty of Relations (1903)
Cuban–American Treaty of Relations (1934)